Rafael Jiménez Inclán (born February 22, 1941) is a Mexican actor. He has starred in movies (several of them of which are so-called ficheras), telenovelas (Spanish soap operas), and stage works. His career began in 1969. He is actor Alfonso Zayas Inclán's cousin.

Inclán was born in Mérida, Yucatán, México.

Selected filmography
 Carnival Nights (1978)
 The Loving Ones (1979)
 Midnight Dolls (1979)
 The Pulque Tavern (1981)
 Bienvenido Paisano (2006) - Epifanio López

Television
 Vivir un poco (1985) - Filogonio Llanos del Toro "Marabunta"
 Rosa salvaje (1987) - Inspector de Policía
 Simplemente María (1989-1990) - Don Chema
 En carne propia (1990) - N/A
 La pícara soñadora (1991) - Camilo López
 Mi querida Isabel (1996-1997) - Pantaleón
 Mi pequeña traviesa (1997-1998) - Marcello
 Camila (1998-1999) - Productor discográfico Luis Lavalle
 DKDA: Sueños de juventud (1999-2000) - Taxista
 Cuento de Navidad (1999-2000) - Don Chente
 Ramona (2000) - Juan Canito
Amigas y rivales (2001) - Moncho/Manuel de la Colina/Jacaranda
 La escuelita VIP - Rafael Inclan (Vivi)
 Clase 406 (2002-2003) - Ezequiel Cuervo
 Rebelde (2005) - Guillermo Arregui
 Código Postal (2006) - Avelino Gutiérrez
 Pasión (2007) - Pirata
 Alma de hierro (2008-2009) - Don Ignacio Hierro González 
 Atrévete a soñar (2009-2010) - Tamir
 Niña de mi corazón (2010) - Vittorio Conti
 Cachito de cielo (2012) - Ernesto Landeros "Pupi"
 Mi corazón es tuyo (2014) - Nicolás Lascuráin
 Mi marido tiene familia (2017) - Eugenio Córcega
 ¿Qué le pasa a mi familia? (2021) - Fulgencio Morales Yela

References

External links
 

1941 births
Best Actor Ariel Award winners
Living people
Mexican male film actors
Mexican male stage actors
Mexican male telenovela actors
Mexican male television actors
20th-century Mexican male actors
Male actors from Yucatán (state)
People from Mérida, Yucatán
21st-century Mexican male actors